Fritz Gazzera (4 December 1907 – 5 January 1996) was a German fencer. He competed in the individual and team foil and team épée events at the 1928 Summer Olympics.

References

1907 births
1996 deaths
German male fencers
Olympic fencers of Germany
Fencers at the 1928 Summer Olympics
Sportspeople from Bonn
20th-century German people